Uromyces beticola is a plant pathogen infecting beet.

References

External links
 Index Fungorum
 USDA ARS Fungal Database

Fungal plant pathogens and diseases
Food plant pathogens and diseases
beticola
Fungi described in 1801